The 13th British Independent Film Awards, held on 5 December 2010 at The Brewery in West London, honoured the best British independent films of 2010.

Awards

Best British Independent Film
 The King's Speech
 Four Lions
 Kick-Ass
 Monsters
 Never Let Me Go

Best Director
 Gareth Edwards – Monsters
 Mike Leigh – Another Year
 Matthew Vaughn – Kick-Ass
 Tom Hooper – The King's Speech
 Mark Romanek – Never Let Me Go

The Douglas Hickox Award
Given to a British director on their debut feature
 Clio Barnard – The Arbor
  Deborah Gardner-Paterson – Africa United
 Rowan Joffé – Brighton Rock
 Chris Morris – Four Lions
 Gareth Edwards – Monsters

Best Actor
 Colin Firth – The King's Speech
 Jim Broadbent – Another Year
 Riz Ahmed – Four Lions
 Scoot McNairy – Monsters
 Aidan Gillen – Treacle Junior

Best Actress
 Carey Mulligan – Never Let Me Go
 Manjinder Virk – The Arbor
 Ruth Sheen – Another Year
 Andrea Riseborough – Brighton Rock
 Sally Hawkins – Made in Dagenham

Best Supporting Actor
 Geoffrey Rush – The King's Speech
 Kayvan Novak – Four Lions
 Guy Pearce – The King's Speech
 Bob Hoskins – Made in Dagenham
 Andrew Garfield – Never Let Me Go

Best Supporting Actress
 Helena Bonham Carter – The King's Speech
 Lesley Manville – Another Year
 Rosamund Pike – Made in Dagenham
 Keira Knightley – Never Let Me Go
 Tamsin Greig – Tamara Drewe

Best Screenplay
 The King's Speech – David Seidler Four Lions – Jesse Armstrong, Sam Bain, Simon Blackwell, Chris Morris
 Kick-Ass - Jane Goldman & Matthew Vaughn
 Made in Dagenham – William Ivory
 Never Let Me Go – Alex Garland

Most Promising Newcomer
 Joanne Froggatt – In Our Name
 Manjinder Virk – The Arbor
 Andrea Riseborough – Brighton Rock
 Tom Hughes – Cemetery Junction
 Conor McCarron – Neds

Best Achievement In Production
 Monsters
 The Arbor
 In Our Name
 Skeletons
 StreetDance 3D

Best Technical Achievement
 Monsters – Visual Effects – Gareth Edwards The Arbor – Sound – Tim Barker
 Brighton Rock – Cinematography – John Mathieson
 The Illusionist – Animation – Sylvain Chomet
 The King's Speech – Production Design – Eve Stewart

Best British Documentary
 Enemies of the People
 The Arbor
 Exit Through the Gift Shop
 Fire in Babylon
 Waste Land

Best British Short
 Baby
 Photograph Of Jesus
 Sign Language
 Sis
 The Road Home

Best Foreign Film
  A Prophet (Un prophète)
 Dogtooth (Kynodontas)
 I Am Love (Io sono l'amore)
 The Secret in Their Eyes (El secreto de sus ojos)
 Winter's Bone

The Raindance Award
 Son Of Babylon
 Brilliant Love
 Jackboots On Whitehall
 Legacy
 Treacle Junior

The Richard Harris Award
 Helena Bonham Carter

The Variety Award
 Liam Neeson

The Special Jury Prize
 Jenne Casarotto

References

External links
 BIFA homepage

British Independent Film Awards
2010 film awards
2010 in British cinema
2010 in London
December 2010 events in the United Kingdom